The men's high jump event at the 1971 Pan American Games was held in Cali on 31 July.

Results

References

Athletics at the 1971 Pan American Games
1971